The University of Cincinnati College of Applied Science (CAS) was an applied science college at the University of Cincinnati in Cincinnati, Ohio. Organized as the Ohio Mechanics Institute (OMI) in 1828, it merged with UC in 1969 and was renamed the OMI College of Applied Science in 1978. On September 22, 2009, CAS merged with the College of Engineering to create the College of Engineering and Applied Science.

References

External links 
 
 "Ohio Mechanics Institute" on Ohio History Central

University of Cincinnati
Educational institutions established in 1828